The Argentine ambassador in Beijing is the official representative of the Government in Buenos Aires to the Government of the People's Republic of China and to the government in Ulaanbaatar (Mongolia).

List of representatives 

Argentina–China relations

References 

China
Argentina